The Xiaomi Mi 4c is a smartphone developed by Xiaomi Inc. It is part of Xiaomi's mid-range smartphone line, and was released in September 2015.
It is only available in mainland China.

The Xiaomi Mi4C is equipped with a Snapdragon 808 processor, a 5-inch 1080p IPS display and a 3080 mAh battery. with 2 GB / 3 GB of memory, and 16GB / 32GB storage in the two versions. It ran Android 5.1.1 Lollipop with the MIUI 7.2.4.0 ROM and now it's upgradeable to Android 7.0 Nougat with the MIUI 9.5.1.0. Unofficially, the device supports up to Android versions up to Android 10 (with LineageOS 17.1). As of 2020, new LineageOS versions are still actively developed for Mi 4c.

Its rear camera is 13 MP with Sony IMX258 or Samsung S5K3M2 and front camera is 5MP with 1080×1920 resolution for video recording. It weighs 132 grams and its dimensions are 138.1x69.6x7.8 mm. It has Wi-Fi 802.11 a/b/g/n/ac, Bluetooth 4.1, GPS, Infrared and USB-C.

The phone was described as an outstanding piece of high-end technology that does not cost as much as its rivals.

It was revealed by AnTuTu that the Mi 4c was one of the 10 most popular phones in China.

References

External links
 Xiaomi Website

Mi 4c
Discontinued smartphones
Mobile phones introduced in 2015
Mobile phones with infrared transmitter